Koos is a Dutch and Afrikaans short form (hypocorism) of the given name Jacobus and a surname. People with this name include:

Given name
Koos Andriessen (born 1928), Dutch government minister
Koos Bekker (born 1952), South African chief executive and billionaire
Koos Bisschoff (fl.1973–1992), South African military officer
Jacobus Boomsma (born 1951), Dutch evolutionary biologist
Koos de la Rey (1847–1914), South African general during the Second Boer War
Koos du Plessis (1945–1984), South African singer-songwriter and poet
Koos van Ellinckhuijzen (1942–2016), Namibian visual artist
Koos Formsma (born 1957), Dutch businessman and football chairman
Koos Hertogs (1949–2015), Dutch serial killer
Koos Issard (born 1971), Dutch water polo player
Koos de Jong (1912–1993), Dutch sports sailor
Koos Kombuis (born 1954), South African musician, singer, songwriter and writer
Koos Köhler (19051965), Dutch water polo player
J. J. van der Leeuw (1893–1934), Dutch theosophist and author
Koos Louw (born 1952), South African Navy officer
Koos Maasdijk (born 1968), Dutch rower
Koos Moerenhout (born 1973), Dutch road bicycle racer
 (born 1932), Dutch journalist and television presenter
Koos Ras (1928–1997), South African singer and comedian
Koos Rietkerk (1927–1986), Dutch politician
Koos Strauss (1900–1990), South African Unity Party politician
Koos Van Den Akker (1939–2015), Dutch-born American fashion designer
Koos van der Merwe (born 1937), South African politician
Koos Verdam (1915–1998), Dutch government minister and Queen's Commissioner
Jacobus "Koos" Verhoeff (1927–2018), Dutch mathematician, computer scientist, and artist
Koos Vorrink (1891–1955), Dutch socialist leader
Koos Waslander (born 1957), Dutch footballer
 (born 1946), Dutch author

Surname
Gábor Koós (born 1986), Hungarian footballer
János Koós (1937–2019), Hungarian pop singer born János Kupsa
Torin Koos (born 1980), American cross country skier

References

Dutch masculine given names

nl:Koos